Mária Ďurišinová (born 17 July 1960) is a Slovak handball player. She competed in the women's tournament at the 1988 Summer Olympics.

Between 1992 and 1998 she was a Member of the National Council for the Party of the Democratic Left.

References

1960 births
Living people
Slovak female handball players
Olympic handball players of Czechoslovakia
Handball players at the 1988 Summer Olympics
Sportspeople from Košice
Politicians from Košice
Members of the National Council (Slovakia) 1992-1994
Members of the National Council (Slovakia) 1994-1998
Female members of the National Council (Slovakia)
Party of the Democratic Left (Slovakia) politicians